Buffalo Township is a township in Jewell County, Kansas, USA.  As of the 2000 census, its population was 574.

Geography
Buffalo Township covers an area of 40.61 square miles (105.18 square kilometers); of this, 0.03 square miles (0.07 square kilometers) or 0.07 percent is water. The stream of Middle Buffalo Creek runs through this township.

Cities and towns
 Jewell

Adjacent townships
 Washington Township (north)
 Grant Township (northeast)
 Vicksburg Township (east)
 Prairie Township (south)
 Browns Creek Township (southwest)
 Calvin Township (west)
 Center Township (northwest)

Cemeteries
The township contains two cemeteries: Jewell and Wallace.

Major highways
 K-14
 K-28
 K-148

Airports and landing strips
 Willmeth Airport

References
 U.S. Board on Geographic Names (GNIS)
 United States Census Bureau cartographic boundary files

External links
 US-Counties.com
 City-Data.com

Townships in Jewell County, Kansas
Townships in Kansas